Las Flores is a city in the province of Buenos Aires, Argentina, and the only city in Las Flores Partido. It is located 187 km from Buenos Aires City. The main economic activities in the area are agriculture and cattle breeding.

Climate

References

 Municipality of Las Flores - Official website.
 

Populated places in Buenos Aires Province
Populated places established in 1856
Cities in Argentina
Argentina